Almojábana is a type of bread made with cuajada cheese and corn flour.

About
An almojábana is a small, bun-shaped bread having a tart flavor. It has some variations between Hispanic America and Spain.

The etymology stems from Andalusi Arabic and that in turn from classical Arabic المُجَبَّنة "almuǧábbana" (made of cheese) the measure II passive participle of the root ج-ب-ن, the same root as جُبْن "jubn" (Cheese).

Ingredients

Colombia
Almojábanas are made with masarepa or pre-cooked white cornmeal, cottage cheese, butter, baking powder, salt, eggs, and milk.

Puerto Rico
In Puerto Rico almojábanas are small fried round-balls eaten in the northwest part of the island. They are made with rice flour, wheat flour, sugar, milk, butter, baking powder, salt, eggs, and fresh white cheese called queso de país. A sweeter version is served on Christmas using coconut milk and vanilla. Sweet almojábana are rolled into cinnamon-sugar and served with a guava sauce.

Spain
Spanish almojábanas don't use cheese, they are made with wheat flour, olive oil, salt, eggs, and honey or sugar or both. They are typical from southern Aragón, southern Alicante, Murcia and La Gomera island (one of the canary islands).

Celebration
The Almojában Festival is celebrated in Lares, Puerto Rico in October.

Gallery

References

See also

 Pandebono
 Arepa

Latin American cuisine
Breads
Puerto Rican cuisine